The Rawhide Years is a 1956 American Western film directed by Rudolph Mate and starring Tony Curtis. Colleen Miller and Arthur Kennedy.

Plot
Ben Matthews gives up the flashy life of a riverboat gambler, hoping to settle down in Galena with his girlfriend, luscious entertainer Zoe. But, Galena's leading citizen is murdered on the riverboat while on their way. Ben is implicated on arrival and flees, all the while working both sides of the law to clear his name. Three years of wandering later, Zoe's letters stop coming and Ben returns to find her. Encountering Rick Harper, whom he initially takes as a would be bandit, they develop a friendship that winds up with both men saving the other's neck.

Cast
 Tony Curtis as Ben Matthews   
 Colleen Miller as Zoe Fontaine    
 Arthur Kennedy as Rick Harper     
 William Demarest as Brand Comfort   
 William Gargan as Marshal Sommers 
 Peter van Eyck as Andre Boucher   
 Minor Watson as Matt Comfort    
 Donald Randolph as Carrico
 Robert Wilke as Neal
 Trevor Bardette as Captain
 James Anderson as Deputy Wade
 Robert Foulk as Mate
 Chubby Johnson as Gif Lessing
 Leigh Snowden as Miss Vanilla Bissell
 Don Beddoe as Frank Porter

See also
 List of American films of 1956

References

External links
 
 
 

1956 films
1956 Western (genre) films
American Western (genre) films
Films set on ships
Universal Pictures films
Films about gambling
Films scored by Hans J. Salter
Films scored by Frank Skinner
1950s English-language films
1950s American films